Murder for Christmas may refer to:
The U.S. publication title of Agatha Christie's Hercule Poirot's Christmas (1938)
Murder for Christmas (1949) by Francis Duncan